Muses Bottom is an unincorporated community in Jackson County, West Virginia, United States. Muses Bottom once had a post office, which is now closed.

The community most likely was named after the local Muse (or Le Mus) family.

References

Unincorporated communities in Jackson County, West Virginia
Unincorporated communities in West Virginia